The Joyn GmbH (formerly 7TV Joint Venture GmbH) is a German joint venture of the media groups ProSiebenSat.1 Media and Warner Bros. Discovery, which deals with streaming media products. Among other things, it operates the streaming platform Joyn, which has more than seven million users per month in January 2020, the pay-per-view service Maxdome Store and the streaming service Discovery+ (which subsumed Eurosport Player).

The streaming platform Joyn officially replaced its predecessor service 7TV on 18 June 2019, and the video-on-demand portal maxdome on 2 September 2020. In the 3rd/4th In the fourth quarter of 2020, the Eurosport Player and, later, the maxdome store were also integrated into Joyn.

Contents 
Joyn offers a free service for smart TVs, mobile and PC devices. This is in German and includes the streaming of some series and films with advertising and live streaming from various TV channels.

JoynPlus 
Joyn Plus is a subscription with exclusive films and series and ad-free streaming, as well as an extended range of live TV channels (in HD and also pay TV channels).

Live streaming 
There are 78 channels.

References

External links 

 Official website

Warner Bros. Discovery brands
ProSiebenSat.1 Media
Companies based in Munich
2017 establishments in Germany
Internet properties established in 2017
Video on demand services